The Indochina Wars were a series of wars which were waged in Southeast Asia from 1946 to 1991, by communist Indochinese forces (mainly the Democratic Republic of Vietnam) against anti-communist forces (mainly French, the State of Vietnam, American, Cambodian, Laotian Royal, and Chinese forces). The term "Indochina" originally referred to French Indochina, which included the current states of Vietnam, Laos, and Cambodia. , it applies largely to a geographic region, rather than to a political area. The wars included:
 The First Indochina War (called the Indochina War in France and the French War in Vietnam) began after the end of World War II in 1946 and lasted until the French defeat in 1954. After a long campaign of resistance against the French and the Japanese, Viet Minh forces had claimed a victory (the August Revolution) after Japanese and Vichy French forces surrendered in the North on 15 August 1945. In the War in Vietnam (1945–46), British forces temporarily occupied the South, starting from 13 September 1945, only to restore French colonial control in 1946. In the United Nations, and through their alliance with the United Kingdom and the United States, the French demanded return of their former Indochina colony prior to agreeing to participate in the NATO alliance (founded in 1949) opposing Soviet expansion beyond the countries of the Warsaw Pact (founded in 1955) in the Cold War. The communist/nationalist Viet Minh, whom the Allies had supported during World War II, continued fighting the French with support from China and the Soviet Union, ultimately forcing the NATO-backed French out of Indochina (1954).
 The Second Indochina War (called the Vietnam War in the West or the American War in Vietnam) began as a conflict between the United States-backed South Vietnamese government and its opponents, both the North Vietnamese-based communist Viet Cong (National Liberation Front) and the  People's Army of Vietnam (PAVN), known in the West as the North Vietnamese Army (NVA). The conflict began in 1955 and lasted until 1975 when the North Vietnamese conquered South Vietnam. The United States, which had supported France during the first Indochina war, backed the Republic of Vietnam government in opposition to the communist Viet Cong and PAVN. The North benefited from military and financial support from China and the Soviet Union, members of the communist bloc. Fighting also occurred during this time in Cambodia between the US-backed government, the PAVN, and the communist-backed Khmer Rouge (known as the Cambodian Civil War, 1967–1975) and in Laos between the US-backed government, the PAVN, and the communist-backed Pathet Lao (known as the Laotian Civil War or Secret War, 1959–1975).
 The Third Indochina War was a period of prolonged conflict following the Vietnam War, in which several wars were fought:

 The Cambodian–Vietnamese War began when Vietnam invaded Cambodia and deposed the genocidal Khmer Rouge regime. The war lasted from May 1975 to December 1989.

 The Sino-Vietnamese War was a short war fought in February–March 1979 between the People's Republic of China and the Socialist Republic of Vietnam. The Chinese launched a punitive expedition in revenge for the Vietnamese invasion of Cambodia, and withdrew a month later to prewar positions. Skirmishes along the border would continue until November 1991.

 After the triumph of the Pathet Lao, an anti-communist insurgency in Laos lasted until most Hmong insurgents surrendered in 2007, though some resistance cells remained active for several years after. Thailand, which supported the Lao insurgents, as well as the anti-Vietnamese forces in the Third Indochina War, fought a few skirmishes with Vietnam in 1984, and a short conflict with Laos in 1987.

FULRO insurgency against Vietnam - United Front for the Liberation of Oppressed Races

 The Communist Party of Thailand fought an insurgency from 1965 to 1989. They received backing from Laos and Vietnam from 1975 to 1979 but were expelled from their bases and lost most of their supply lines after they sided with the Cambodian-Chinese aligned forces, rather than the pro-Soviet Vietnamese and Laotian regimes.

Background

French Indochina

French colonization and occupation of the region was a consequence of missionary work of the 16th century, which had resulted in Catholics forming a converted minority. While Gia Long tolerated Catholicism, his successors Minh Mạng and were orthodox Confucians, admiring ancient Chinese culture. They forbade Catholic proselytism, as it was usually the religious arm of colonization and they resisted European and American attempts to establish colonial trade posts, which France tried to impose against the laws of the country. This was seen by colonial powers as "provocative".

Confucian isolationist policy led the Vietnamese to refuse industrial modernization, so that they were not able to resist military power of a French invasion. In August 1858, Napoleon III ordered the landing of French forces at Tourane, (present-day Da Nang), beginning a colonial occupation that was to last almost a century. By 1884, the French had complete control over the country, which now formed the largest part of French Indochina. It took the Vietnamese people almost a century to expel the last colonial influence in their country.

Indochina during World War II

A continuous thread of local resistance began with Hàm Nghi, then to Phan Đình Phùng, Phan Bội Châu and lastly to Ho Chi Minh, who returned to Vietnam from France and helped to create the Viet Minh national independence coalition in 1941. A founding member of the French Communist Party, Ho Chi Minh had de-emphasised his communist ties and dissolved the Indochinese Communist Party, in order to unite the country. When the Vietnamese famine broke out in 1945 causing 2 million deaths, after French and Japanese colonial administration continued to export food to France in a post war economy, the Viet Minh arranged a massive relief effort, consolidating popular support for their nationalist cause. Ho Chi Minh was elected Prime Minister of the Viet Minh in 1945.

When World War II ended, the August Revolution expelled the Japanese colonial army and gave control of the country to Viet Minh. The Japanese surrendered to the Chinese Nationalists in North Vietnam. Emperor Bảo Đại abdicated power to the Viet Minh, on August 25, 1945. In a popular move, Ho Chi Minh made Bảo Đại "supreme adviser" to the Viet Minh-led government in Hanoi, which asserted its independence on September 2 as the Democratic Republic of Vietnam (DRV) and issued a Proclamation of Independence of the Democratic Republic of Vietnam. In 1946, Vietnam had its first constitution.

In 1948, France tried to regain its colonial control over Vietnam. In South Vietnam, the Japanese had surrendered to British forces, who had supported the Free French in fighting the Viet Minh, along with the armed religious Cao Đài and Hòa Hảo sects and the Bình Xuyên organized crime group. The French re-installed Bảo Đại as the head of state of Vietnam, which now comprised central and southern Vietnam. The ensuing war, between the French-controlled South and the independent communist-allied North, is known as the First Indochina War. It ended in a resounding defeat of the French Colonial Troops (Troupes coloniales) by the People's Army of Vietnam at Dien Bien Phu.

History

First Indochina War

In the First Indochina War, the Viet Minh, supported by the People's Republic of China and the Soviet Union, fought to gain their independence from the French, supported initially by the remaining troops of the Japanese Army after its surrender to Britain, also by the State of Vietnam, and later by the United States in the frame of the Cold War. This war of independence lasted from December 1946 until July 1954, with most of the fighting taking place in areas surrounding Hanoi. It ended with the French defeat at the Battle of Dien Bien Phu and French withdrawal from Vietnam after the Geneva Accords.

Second Indochina War

The Second Indochina War, commonly known as the Vietnam War, pitted the recently successful Communist Vietnam People's Army (VPA or PAVN, but also known as the North Vietnamese Army or NVA) and the National Front for the Liberation of Vietnam (Vietnamese NLF guerrilla fighters allied with the PAVN, known in America as the Viet Cong, meaning 'Communists Traitor to Vietnam') against United States troops and the United States-backed by South Vietnamese Government ARVN (Republic of Vietnam soldiers).

During the War, the North Vietnamese transported most of their supplies via the Ho Chi Minh Trail (known to the Vietnamese as the Truong Son Trail, after the Truong Son mountains), which ran through Laos and Cambodia. As a result, the areas of these nations bordering Vietnam would see heavy combat during the war.

For the United States, the political and combat goals were ambiguous: success and progress were ill-defined and, along with the large numbers of casualties, the Vietnam War raised moral issues that made the war increasingly unpopular at home. U.S. news reports of the 1968 Tet offensive, especially from CBS, were unfavorable in regard to the lack of progress in ending the war. Although the 1968 Tet offensive resulted in a military victory for South Vietnam and the United States, with virtually complete destruction of the NLF forces combat capability, it was, by the intensity of the combats, the contradiction it implied with recent reports of withdrawals of US troops and status of the war, also a turning point in American voter opposition to U.S. support for their Cold War Vietnamese allies.

The United States began withdrawing troops from Vietnam in 1970, with the last troops returning in January, 1973. The Paris Peace Accords called for a cease-fire, and prohibited the North Vietnamese from sending more troops into South Vietnam - although the North Vietnamese were permitted to continue to occupy those regions of South Vietnam they had conquered in the 1972 Easter Offensive.

The North Vietnamese never intended to abide by the agreement. Fighting continued sporadically through 1973 and 1974, while the North Vietnamese planned a major offensive, tentatively scheduled for 1976. The North Vietnamese Army in South Vietnam had been ravaged during the Easter offensive in 1973, and it was projected that it would take until 1976 to rebuild their logistical capabilities.

The withdrawal had catastrophic effects on the South Vietnamese Army (ARVN). Shortly after the Paris Peace Accords, the United States Congress made major budget cuts in military aid to the South Vietnamese. The ARVN, which had been trained by American troops to use American tactics, quickly fell into disarray. Although it remained an effective fighting force throughout 1973 and 1974, by January 1975 it had disintegrated. The North Vietnamese hurriedly attacked the much weakened South, and were met with little resistance.

Saigon, the capital of South Vietnam, was taken by the PAVN on April 30, 1975, and the Second Indochina War ended.

The fighting that took place between North and South Vietnam following United States withdrawal is sometimes called the Third Indochina War; this term usually refers to a later 1979 conflict, however (see below).

Third Indochina War

The Third Indochina War, commonly known as the Cambodian–Vietnamese War, started on 1 May 1975 when the Kampuchean Revolutionary Army invaded the Vietnamese island of Phu Quoc. Vietnamese forces quickly counter-attacked, regaining their territory and invading the Kampuchean island of Koh Wai.

In August 1975, Vietnam returned the island of Koh Wai to Kampuchea and both governments started making peaceful noises, but behind the scenes tensions were mounting. On 30 April 1977, Kampuchea started attacking Vietnamese villages. In September, six divisions crossed the border, advancing 10 kilometers (6.2 mi) into Tay Ninh Province. Angered by the scale of the attacks, the Vietnam People’s Army assembled eight divisions to launch a retaliatory strike against Kampuchea.

In December, in an effort to force the Kampuchean government to negotiate, the Vietnamese forces invaded Kampuchea, easily defeating the Kampuchean army. On 6 January 1978, Vietnamese forces were only 38 kilometers (24 mi) from Phnom Penh; however, the Kampuchean government remained defiant and the Vietnamese leadership realised they would not secure their political objective and decided to withdraw their troops.

As Kampuchean forces soon resumed their attacks across the border, the Vietnamese launched another limited counter-attack in June, forcing the Kampucheans to retreat. Again the Vietnamese withdrew and the Kampucheans resumed their attacks. The Vietnamese had had enough; in December 1978, Vietnam launched a full-scale invasion. Phnom Penh was captured in January 1979, the ruling Khmer Rouge were driven from power and a pro-Vietnamese government was installed.

In 1984, Vietnam unveiled a plan for the disengagement of its army from Kampuchea. In 1988, the Vietnamese Government began withdrawing forces in earnest; the last men left in September 1989.

The Third Indochina War also refers to the Sino-Vietnamese War, which was fought in February–March 1979 between the People's Republic of China and the Socialist Republic of Vietnam. Shortly after the Vietnamese invasion of Cambodia, the People's Republic of China, who were the Khmer Rouge's political ally, launched a punitive invasion of Vietnam. Fighting was short but intense. The Chinese advanced about forty kilometers into Vietnam, occupying the city of Lang Son on 6 March. There, they claimed the gate to Hanoi was open, declared their punitive mission achieved, and withdrew.

On 23 October 1991, the Cambodian-Vietnamese War was officially declared over as a result of negotiations and the signing of 1991 Paris Peace Agreements.

See also
Korean War
Sino-Soviet split

References

Further reading 
 

 
20th century in Cambodia
20th century in Laos
20th century in Vietnam
Cold War conflicts
Wars involving Cambodia
Wars involving Laos
Wars involving Vietnam